The Rio Riot was a hard disk-based "jukebox" MP3 digital audio player produced by Diamond Multimedia as part of the Rio line.  It shipped in 2002.  It was an early competitor to the Apple iPod.

Features
The Rio Riot featured:
20 gigabytes of storage.
USB connectivity
a large backlit monochrome graphic LCD display.
FM tuner
10 hours per charge at 50% volume battery life
ID3 and WMA tagging support
iTunes support
Note* Lacked ability to retrieve data off HD.

Supported Formats
WMA
MP3

References

 Manual

Digital audio players
Audiovisual introductions in 2002